Paul Jaworski (born Paul Poluszynski, 1900, died January 21, 1929) was a Polish-American gangster born in Poland. He immigrated to the United States in 1905. Although born to Catholic parents, when offered the services of a chaplain before his execution Jaworski said: "I preached atheism since the day I quit singing the choir. A man is yellow if he spends his life believing in nothing and then comes crawling to the church because he is afraid his death is near."

First armored car robbery
He was the leader of the Flathead gang, which committed the first-ever armored car robbery, on March 11, 1927. The gang stole over $104,000 from an armored vehicle on Bethel Road (now Brightwood Road), Bethel, (now Bethel Park), 7 miles outside of Pittsburgh, Pennsylvania. The bandits placed 500 pounds of black powder (stolen the previous day from nearby Mine 3 in Mollenaur, PA) under the roadbed, and made off with money that was on its way to Coverdale, Pennsylvania for the Pittsburgh Terminal Coal Company.

Detroit News payroll robbery
The gang was also known for the payroll robbery of The Detroit News business offices in 1928.

Execution
Jaworski was shot and arrested in Detroit on 13 September 1928, while attempting to escape from the police across Chambers Avenue, after being hunted down to a nearby restaurant. He was sentenced to death in Pennsylvania on January 2, but received a stay of execution, until a sanity evaluation could be completed.
Jaworski was executed by electric chair in Pennsylvania for a separate payroll robbery which resulted in a murder. The execution took place on January 21, 1929.

See also
Toni Musulin

References

Books

1900 births
1929 deaths
Criminals from Pennsylvania
American people of Polish descent
American bank robbers
People executed for murder
Executed Polish people
20th-century executions by Pennsylvania
People executed by Pennsylvania by electric chair
20th-century executions of American people
Polish people executed abroad
American people convicted of murder
People convicted of murder by Pennsylvania
People from Allegheny County, Pennsylvania
American atheists
History of Detroit
People from Cleveland
Emigrants from the Russian Empire to the United States
Prohibition-era gangsters